Space Shuttle Challenger (OV-099) was a Space Shuttle orbiter manufactured by Rockwell International and operated by NASA. Named after the commanding ship of a nineteenth-century scientific expedition that traveled the world, Challenger was the second Space Shuttle orbiter to fly into space after Columbia, and launched on its maiden flight in April 1983. It was destroyed in January 1986 soon after launch in an accident that killed all seven crewmembers aboard. Initially manufactured as a test article not intended for spaceflight, it was utilized for ground testing of the Space Shuttle orbiter's structural design. However, after NASA found that their original plan to upgrade Enterprise for spaceflight would be more expensive than upgrading Challenger, the orbiter was pressed into operational service in the Space Shuttle program. Lessons learned from the first orbital flights of Columbia led to Challengers design possessing fewer thermal protection system tiles and a lighter fuselage and wings. This led to it being  lighter than Columbia, though still  heavier than Discovery.

During its three years of operation, Challenger was flown on ten missions in the Space Shuttle program, spending over 62 days in space and completing almost 1,000 orbits around Earth. Following its maiden flight, Challenger supplanted Columbia as the leader of the Space Shuttle fleet, being the most-flown orbiter during all three years of its operation while Columbia itself was seldom used during the same time frame. Challenger was used for numerous civilian satellite launches, such as the first tracking and data relay satellite, the Palapa B communications satellites, the Long Duration Exposure Facility, and the Earth Radiation Budget Satellite. It was also used as a test bed for the Manned Maneuvering Unit (MMU) and served as the platform to repair the malfunctioning SolarMax telescope. In addition, three consecutive Spacelab missions were conducted with the orbiter in 1985, one of which being the first German crewed spaceflight mission. Passengers carried into orbit by Challenger include the first American female astronaut, the first American female spacewalker, the first African-American astronaut, and the first Canadian astronaut.

On its tenth flight in January 1986, Challenger disintegrated 73 seconds after liftoff, killing the seven-member crew of STS-51-L that included Christa McAuliffe, who would have been the first teacher in space. The Rogers Commission convened shortly afterwards concluded that an O-ring seal in one of Challengers solid rocket boosters failed to contain pressurized burning gas that leaked out of the booster, causing a structural failure of Challengers external tank and the orbiter's subsequent disintegration due to aerodynamic forces. NASA's organizational culture was also scrutinized by the Rogers Commission, and the Space Shuttle program's goal of replacing the United States' expendable launch systems was cast into doubt. The loss of Challenger and its crew led to a broad rescope of the program, and numerous aspects – such as launches from Vandenberg, the MMU, and Shuttle-Centaur – were scrapped to improve crew safety; Challenger and Atlantis were the only orbiters modified to conduct Shuttle-Centaur launches. The recovered remains of the orbiter are mostly buried in a missile silo located at Cape Canaveral LC-31, though one piece is on display at the Kennedy Space Center Visitor Complex.

History
Challenger was named after HMS Challenger, a British corvette that was the command ship for the Challenger Expedition, a pioneering global marine research expedition undertaken from 1872 through 1876.  The Apollo 17 Lunar Module, which landed on the Moon in 1972, was also named Challenger.

Construction

Because of the low production volume of orbiters, the Space Shuttle program decided to build a vehicle as a Structural Test Article, STA-099, that could later be converted to a flight vehicle. The contract for STA-099 was awarded to North American Rockwell on July 26, 1972, and construction was completed in February 1978. After STA-099's rollout, it was sent to a Lockheed test site in Palmdale, where it spent over 11 months in vibration tests designed to simulate entire shuttle flights, from launch to landing. To prevent damage during structural testing, qualification tests were performed to a safety factor of 1.2 times the design limit loads. The qualification tests were used to validate computational models, and compliance with the required 1.4 factor of safety was shown by analysis. STA-099 was essentially a complete airframe of a Space Shuttle orbiter, with only a mockup crew module installed and thermal insulation placed on its forward fuselage.

NASA planned to refit the prototype orbiter Enterprise (OV-101), used for flight testing, as the second operational orbiter; but Enterprise lacked most of the systems needed for flight, including a functional propulsion system, thermal insulation, a life support system, and most of the cockpit instrumentation. Modifying it for spaceflight was considered to be too difficult, expensive, and time-consuming. Since STA-099 was not as far along in the construction of its airframe, it would be easier to upgrade to a flight article. Because STA-099's qualification testing prevented damage, NASA found that rebuilding STA-099 as a flight worthy orbiter would be less expensive than refitting Enterprise. Work on converting STA-099 to operational status began in January 1979, starting with the crew module (the pressurized portion of the vehicle), as the rest of the vehicle was still being used for testing by Lockheed. STA-099 returned to the Rockwell plant in November 1979, and the original, unfinished crew module was replaced with the newly constructed model. Major parts of STA-099, including the payload bay doors, body flap, wings, and vertical stabilizer, also had to be returned to their individual subcontractors for rework. By early 1981, most of these components had returned to Palmdale to be reinstalled. Work continued on the conversion until July 1982, when the new orbiter was rolled out as Challenger.

Challenger, as did the orbiters built after it, had fewer tiles in its Thermal Protection System than Columbia, though it still made heavier use of the white LRSI tiles on the cabin and main fuselage than did the later orbiters. Most of the tiles on the payload bay doors, upper wing surfaces, and rear fuselage surfaces were replaced with DuPont white Nomex felt insulation. These modifications and an overall lighter structure allowed Challenger to carry 2,500 lb (1,100 kg) more payload than Columbia. Challengers fuselage and wings were stronger and lighter than Columbias. The hatch and vertical-stabilizer tile patterns were different from those of the other orbiters. Challenger was the first orbiter to have a head-up display system for use in the descent phase of a mission, and the first to feature Phase I main engines rated for 104% maximum thrust.

Construction milestones (as STA-099)

Construction milestones (as OV-099)

Flights and modifications
 	
After its first flight in April 1983, Challenger quickly became the workhorse of NASA's Space Shuttle fleet, flying six of nine Space Shuttle missions in 1983 and 1984. Even when the orbiters Discovery and Atlantis joined the fleet, Challenger flew three missions a year from 1983 to 1985. Challenger, along with Atlantis, was modified at Kennedy Space Center to be able to carry the Centaur-G upper stage in its payload bay. If flight STS-51-L had been successful, Challengers next mission would have been the deployment of the Ulysses probe with the Centaur to study the polar regions of the Sun.

Challenger flew the first American woman, African-American, Dutchman, and Canadian into space; carried three Spacelab missions; and performed the first night launch and night landing of a Space Shuttle.

Final mission and destruction 

STS-51-L was the orbiter's tenth and final flight, initially planned to launch on January 26, 1986 (after several technical and paperwork delays). This mission attracted huge media attention, as one of the crew was a civilian schoolteacher, Christa McAuliffe, who was assigned to carry out live lessons from the orbiter (as part of NASA's Teacher in Space Project). Other members would deploy the TDRS-B satellite and conduct comet observations.

Challenger blasted off at 11:38 am EST on January 28, 1986. Just over a minute into the flight, the faulty booster joint opened up, leading to a flame that melted securing struts which resulted in a catastrophic structural failure and explosion of the External Tank. The resulting pressure waves and aerodynamic forces destroyed the orbiter, resulting in the loss of all the crew.

Challenger was the first Space Shuttle to be destroyed in a mission accident. The collected debris of the vessel is currently buried in decommissioned missile silos at Launch Complex 31, Cape Canaveral Air Force Station. A section of the fuselage recovered from Space Shuttle Challenger can also be found at the "Forever Remembered" memorial at the Kennedy Space Center Visitor Complex in Florida. Debris from the orbiter sometimes washes up on the Florida coast. This is collected and transported to the silos for storage. Because of its early loss, Challenger was the only Space Shuttle that never wore the NASA "meatball" logo, and was never modified with the MEDS "glass cockpit". The tail was never fitted with a drag chute, which was fitted to the remaining orbiters in 1992. Challenger and sister ship Columbia are the only two shuttles that never visited the Mir Space Station or the International Space Station. In September 2020 Netflix released Challenger: The Final Flight, a four-part miniseries created by Steven Leckart and Glen Zipper documenting the tragedy firsthand.

Lawsuits 

In March 1988 the federal government and Morton Thiokol Inc. agreed to pay $7.7 million in cash and annuities to the families of four of the seven Challenger astronauts as part of a settlement aimed at avoiding lawsuits in the nation's worst space disaster, according to government documents.
The documents show that Morton Thiokol, which manufactured the faulty solid rocket boosters blamed for the accident, paid 60 percent, or $4,641,000. The remainder, $3,094,000, was paid by the government.

In September 1988 a federal judge dismissed two lawsuits seeking $3 billion from Space Shuttle rocket-maker Morton Thiokol Inc. by Roger Boisjoly, a former company engineer who warned against the ill-fated 1986 Challenger launch.

List of missions

Mission and tribute insignias

* Mission canceled due to loss of Challenger on STS-51-L.

See also

 List of human spaceflights
 List of Space Shuttle crews
 List of Space Shuttle missions
 Timeline of Space Shuttle missions
 List of human spaceflights chronologically
 Challenger flag
 Challenger Colles, mountain range on Pluto named for the Space Shuttle

References

Further reading

External links

 Ronald Reagan: Address to the Nation on the Explosion of the Space Shuttle Challenger
 Space Shuttle Challenger Explosion video
 Shuttle Orbiter Challenger (OV-99)
 Rogers Commission Report 
 Astronautix on Challenger
 Space Shuttle Challenger: A Tribute  – slideshow by Life (magazine)
 Go or No Go: The Challenger Legacy an Emmy-winning short documentary by Retro Report
 Challenger Mission Videos of the Accident from Spaceflightnow.com
 NASA film on the accident and investigation downloadable from archive.org The Internet Archive
 Memorial to Greg Jarvis in Hermosa Beach, California at "Sites of Memory"
 Personal Observations on the Reliability of the Shuttle by R. P. Feynman 
 RealPlayer video of Feynman's O-Ring demonstration (low quality)
 CBS Radio news Bulletin Anchored by Christopher Glenn of the Challenger Disaster from  January 28, 1986, Part 2 of CBS Radio coverage of Challenger Disaster, Part 3 of CBS Radio News coverage of Challenger disaster, Part 4 of CBS Radio news coverage of Challenger disaster
 Image of silo storing Challenger debris
 Space Shuttle Memorial covering both space shuttle disasters
 Space Shuttle Challenger STS-51L Accident Investigation

Challenger
Challenger

Destroyed spacecraft
Individual rockets
Individual aircraft